Jorge Bunster (born 17 March 1953) is a Chilean businessman and politician. He served as the general manager of Empresas Copec for 19 years. He served as the Chilean Minister of Energy from 2012 to 2014.

References

Living people
1953 births
People from Santiago
Chilean businesspeople
Government ministers of Chile